is a railway station in Fukuyama, Hiroshima Prefecture, Japan, operated by West Japan Railway Company (JR West).

Lines
Matsunaga Station is served by the San'yō Main Line.

See also
 List of railway stations in Japan

External links

  

Railway stations in Hiroshima Prefecture
Sanyō Main Line
Railway stations in Japan opened in 1891